Lampropholis coggeri, also known commonly as the northern sun skink and the rainforest sunskink, is a species of lizard in the family Scincidae. The species is endemic to Queensland in Australia.

Etymology
The specific name, coggeri, is in honor of Australian herpetologist Harold Cogger.

Habitat

Description
There are five digits on each of the four feet.

Behavior
L. coggeri is a terrestrial species, living and foraging on the forest floor, and basking in sunny areas.

Reproduction
L. coggeri is oviparous.

References

Further reading
Cogger HG (2014). Reptiles and Amphibians of Australia, Seventh Edition. Clayton, Victoria, Australia: CSIRO Publishing. xxx + 1,033 pp. .
Ingram GJ (1991). "Five new skinks from Queensland rainforests". Memoirs of the Queensland Museum 30 (3): 443–453. (Lampropholis coggeri, new species, p. 448).
Wilson S, Swan G (2013). A Complete Guide to Reptiles of Australia, Fourth Edition. Sydney: New Holland Publishers. 522 pp. .

Skinks of Australia
Endemic fauna of Australia
Reptiles described in 1991
Lampropholis
Taxa named by Glen Joseph Ingram